Adventures of Johnny Tao is a 2007 kung fu-zombie film written and directed by Kenn Troum, under the name Kenn Scott. It stars Matthew Twining, Chris Yen, Matt Mullins, Kelly Perine, James Hong, and Jason London.

Plot
Johnny Dow struggles to make a living at his small town gas station by charging motorists to see the electric guitar used by his late father, who was a one-hit-rock and roll wonder. Legend has it the guitar was carved in the shape of a dragon's head and made in part from an ancient spear his father found in the crater of a shooting star. When Johnny's friend Eddie stumbles upon the other half of the spear he releases an ancient demon hungry for power and destruction. Mika, a beautiful Chinese warrior who holds the secret to fighting Eddie and his army of kung-fu, sugar-craving warriors reveals to Johnny that the only way to stop the evil spirit is to use the first half of the spear - the dragon on Johnny's guitar! Together Johnny and Mika set out to fight Eddie and his army, reunite the two halves of the spear, restore peace to the town and - of course - save the world!

Cast
Matthew Twining as Johnny Dow
Chris Yen as Mika
James Hong as Sifu
Jason London as Jimmy Dow

References

External links
 

 Adventures of Johnny Tao Official site

2007 films
American martial arts films
Martial arts horror films
2000s comedy horror films
2007 martial arts films
American comedy horror films
2007 comedy films
2000s English-language films
2000s American films